Rusk Glacier is located on the eastern face of Mount Adams in the U.S. state of Washington. The glacier has decreased in surface area by 23 percent between 1904 and 2006.

The glacier was named for Claude Ewing Rusk, who made the first ascent of The Castle in 1921, by Harry Fielding Reid.

See also
List of glaciers in the United States

References

Glaciers of Mount Adams (Washington)
Mount Adams (Washington)
Gifford Pinchot National Forest
Glaciers of Yakima County, Washington
Glaciers of Washington (state)